The Taichung Municipal Taichung Industrial High School  is a vocational school in South District, Taichung, Taiwan, also the one of the top vocational high school in Taiwan,  near National Chung Hsing University, Daqing Station, THSR Taichung Station, National Library of Public Information

History 

 Built in 1938，the name was 「Taichung County Taichung Industrial School」
 In 1945，the name was changed to 「Taiwan Provincial Taichung Industrial School」
 In August, 1951，the name was changed to 「Taiwan Provincial Taichung Industrial High School」
 In 1953，It has been a demonstration school
 In 2000，the name was changed to 「National Taichung Industrial High School」。
 In 2017, the name was changed to 「Taichung Municipal Taichung Industrial High School」

Transportation 
Buses in Taichung
 Ubus：3、53、73、79
 Taichung Bus：33、35、82、101、102
 Chuan Hang Tourism：58、65
 Ren-Yeou Bus：105
 CTbus : 125
 G-Bus：166

External links 

 Taichung Municipal Taichung Industrial High School

1938 establishments in Taiwan
Educational institutions established in 1938
Schools in Taichung